Abderrahman Ladgham (born 18 October 1947) is a Tunisian politician. He serves as the Deputy Prime Minister for Governance & Combating Corruption under Prime Minister Hamadi Jebali.

Biography

Early life and career
Ladgham was born on October 18, 1947, in Le Bardo, Tunisia. He attended the Faculty of Medicine in Tunis and he joined the student union Union Générale des Etudiants de Tunisie (UGET). He then studied cancerology in Paris. Back in Tunis, he worked as a university professor and as a cancerologue.

Political life
He is a member of the Ettakol political party. On 20 December 2011, after former President Zine El Abidine Ben Ali was deposed, he joined the Jebali Cabinet as Deputy Prime Minister for Governance & Combating Corruption.

Personal life
Ladgham is married and has three children.

References

External links
 

Living people
1947 births
People from Tunis
Tunisian academics
Government ministers of Tunisia
Members of the Constituent Assembly of Tunisia